Tourmaline is a crystalline silicate mineral group in which boron is compounded with elements such as aluminium, iron, magnesium, sodium, lithium, or potassium. Tourmaline is a gemstone and can be found in a wide variety of colors.

The term is derived from the Sinhalese "tōramalli", which refers to the carnelian gemstones.

History 
Brightly colored Ceylonese gem tourmalines were brought to Europe in great quantities by the Dutch East India Company to satisfy a demand for curiosities and gems. Tourmaline was sometimes called the "Ceylonese Magnet" because it could attract and then repel hot ashes due to its pyroelectric properties.

Tourmalines were used by chemists in the 19th century to polarize light by shining rays onto a cut and polished surface of the gem.

Species and varieties 
Commonly encountered species and varieties:

Schorl species:
 Brownish black to black—schorl,
Dravite species: from the Drave district of Carinthia
 Dark yellow to brownish black—dravite,
Elbaite species: named after the island of Elba, Italy
 Red or pinkish-red—rubellite variety,
 Light blue to bluish green— indicolite variety (from indigo),
 Green—verdelite or emerald variety,
 Colorless—achroite variety (from the Greek "άχρωμος" meaning "colorless").

Schorl 

The most common species of tourmaline is schorl, the sodium iron (divalent) endmember of the group. It may account for 95% or more of all tourmaline in nature. The early history of the mineral schorl shows that the name "schorl" was in use prior to 1400 because a village known today as Zschorlau (in Saxony, Germany) was then named "Schorl" (or minor variants of this name), and the village had a nearby tin mine where, in addition to cassiterite, black tourmaline was found. The first description of schorl with the name "schürl" and its occurrence (various tin mines in the Ore Mountains) was written by Johannes Mathesius (1504–1565) in 1562 under the title "Sarepta oder Bergpostill". Up to about 1600, additional names used in the German language were "Schurel", "Schörle", and "Schurl". Beginning in the 18th century, the name Schörl was mainly used in the German-speaking area. In English, the names shorl and shirl were used in the 18th century. In the 19th century the names common schorl, schörl, schorl and iron tourmaline were the English words used for this mineral.

Dravite 

Dravite, also called brown tourmaline, is the sodium magnesium rich tourmaline endmember. Uvite, in comparison, is a calcium magnesium tourmaline. Dravite forms multiple series, with other tourmaline members, including schorl and elbaite.

The name dravite was used for the first time by Gustav Tschermak (1836–1927), Professor of Mineralogy and Petrography at the University of Vienna, in his book Lehrbuch der Mineralogie (published in 1884) for magnesium-rich (and sodium-rich) tourmaline from village Dobrova near Unterdrauburg in the Drava river area, Carinthia, Austro-Hungarian Empire. Today this tourmaline locality (type locality for dravite) at Dobrova (near Dravograd), is a part of the Republic of Slovenia. Tschermak gave this tourmaline the name dravite, for the Drava river area, which is the district along the Drava River (in German: Drau, in Latin: Drave) in Austria and Slovenia. The chemical composition which was given by Tschermak in 1884 for this dravite approximately corresponds to the formula , which is in good agreement (except for the OH content) with the endmember formula of dravite as known today.
 
Dravite varieties include the deep green chromium dravite and the vanadium dravite.

Elbaite 

A lithium-tourmaline elbaite was one of three pegmatitic minerals from Utö, Sweden, in which the new alkali element lithium (Li) was determined in 1818 by Johan August Arfwedson for the first time. Elba Island, Italy, was one of the first localities where colored and colorless Li-tourmalines were extensively chemically analysed. In 1850 Karl Friedrich August Rammelsberg described fluorine (F) in tourmaline for the first time. In 1870 he proved that all varieties of tourmaline contain chemically bound water. In 1889 Scharitzer proposed the substitution of (OH) by F in red Li-tourmaline from Sušice, Czech Republic. In 1914 Vladimir Vernadsky proposed the name Elbait for lithium-, sodium-, and aluminum-rich tourmaline from Elba Island, Italy, with the simplified formula . Most likely the type material for elbaite was found at Fonte del Prete, San Piero in Campo, Campo nell'Elba, Elba Island, Province of Livorno, Tuscany, Italy. The first crystal structure determination of a Li-rich tourmaline was published in 1972 by Donnay and Barton, performed on a pink elbaite from San Diego County, California, United States.

Chemical composition 

The tourmaline mineral group is chemically one of the most complicated groups of silicate minerals.

 X = Ca, Na, K, ▢ = vacancy
 Y = Li, Mg, Fe2+, Mn2+, Zn, Al, Cr3+, V3+, Fe3+, Ti4+, ▢ = vacancy
 Z = Mg, Al, Fe3+, Cr3+, V3+
 T = Si, Al, B
 B = B, ▢ = vacancy
 V = OH, O
 W = OH, F, O

 
A revised nomenclature for the tourmaline group was published in 2011.

Physical properties

Crystal structure 

Tourmaline is a six-member ring cyclosilicate having a trigonal crystal system. It occurs as long, slender to thick prismatic and columnar crystals that are usually triangular in cross-section, often with curved striated faces. The style of termination at the ends of crystals is sometimes asymmetrical, called hemimorphism. Small slender prismatic crystals are common in a fine-grained granite called aplite, often forming radial daisy-like patterns. Tourmaline is distinguished by its three-sided prisms; no other common mineral has three sides. Prisms faces often have heavy vertical striations that produce a rounded triangular effect. Tourmaline is rarely perfectly euhedral. An exception was the fine dravite tourmalines of Yinnietharra, in western Australia. The deposit was discovered in the 1970s, but is now exhausted. All hemimorphic crystals are piezoelectric, and are often pyroelectric as well.

A crystal of tourmaline is built up of units consisting of a six-member silica ring that binds above to a large cation, such as sodium. The ring binds below to a layer of metal ions and hydroxyls or halogens, which structurally resembles a fragment of kaolin. This in turn binds to three triangular borate ions. Units joined end to end form columns running the length of the crystal. Each column binds with two other columns offset one-third and two-thirds of the vertical length of a single unit to form bundles of three columns.  Bundles are packed together to form the final crystal structure. Because the neighboring columns are offset, the basic structural unit is not a unit cell: The actual unit cell of this structure includes portions of several units belonging to adjacent columns.

Color 

Tourmaline has a variety of colors. Iron-rich tourmalines are usually black to bluish-black to deep brown, while magnesium-rich varieties are brown to yellow, and lithium-rich tourmalines are almost any color: blue, green, red, yellow, pink, etc. Rarely, it is colorless. Bi-colored and multicolored crystals are common, reflecting variations of fluid chemistry during crystallization. Crystals may be green at one end and pink at the other, or green on the outside and pink inside; this type is called watermelon tourmaline and is prized in jewelry.  An excellent example of watermelon tourmaline jewelry is a brooch piece (1969, gold, watermelon tourmaline, diamonds) by Andrew Grima (British, b. Italy, 1921–2007), in the collection of Kimberly Klosterman and on display at the Cincinnati Art Museum. Some forms of tourmaline are dichroic; they change color when viewed from different directions.

The pink color of tourmalines from many localities is the result of prolonged natural irradiation. During their growth, these tourmaline crystals incorporated Mn2+ and were initially very pale. Due to natural gamma ray exposure from radioactive decay of 40K in their granitic environment, gradual formation of Mn3+ ions occurs, which is responsible for the deepening of the pink to red color.

Magnetism 
Opaque black schorl and yellow tsilaisite are idiochromatic tourmaline species that have high magnetic susceptibilities due to high concentrations of iron and manganese respectively. Most gem-quality tourmalines are of the elbaite species. Elbaite tourmalines are allochromatic, deriving most of their color and magnetic susceptibility from schorl (which imparts iron) and tsilaisite (which imparts manganese).

Red and pink tourmalines have the lowest magnetic susceptibilities among the elbaites, while tourmalines with bright yellow, green and blue colors are the most magnetic elbaites. Dravite species such as green chromium dravite and brown dravite are diamagnetic. A handheld neodymium magnet can be used to identify or separate some types of tourmaline gems from others. For example, blue indicolite tourmaline is the only blue gemstone of any kind that will show a drag response when a neodymium magnet is applied. Any blue tourmaline that is diamagnetic can be identified as paraiba tourmaline colored by copper in contrast to magnetic blue tourmaline colored by iron.

Treatments 
Some tourmaline gems, especially pink to red colored stones, are altered by heat treatment to improve their color. Overly dark red stones can be lightened by careful heat treatment. The pink color in manganese-containing near-colorless to pale pink stones can be greatly increased by irradiation with gamma-rays or electron beams. Irradiation is almost impossible to detect in tourmalines, and does not, currently, affect the value. Heavily included tourmalines, such as rubellite and Brazilian paraiba, are sometimes clarity-enhanced. A clarity-enhanced tourmaline (especially the paraiba variety) is worth much less than an untreated gem of equal clarity.

Geology 
Tourmaline is found in granite and granite pegmatites and in metamorphic rocks such as schist and marble. Schorl and lithium-rich tourmalines are usually found in granite and granite pegmatite. Magnesium-rich tourmalines, dravites, are generally restricted to schists and marble. Tourmaline is a durable mineral and can be found in minor amounts as grains in sandstone and conglomerate, and is part of the ZTR index for highly weathered sediments.

Localities 
Gem and specimen tourmaline is mined chiefly in Brazil and many parts of Africa, including Tanzania, Nigeria, Kenya, Madagascar, Mozambique, Malawi, and Namibia. It is also mined in Asia, notably in Pakistan, Afghanistan, and Indonesia as well as in Sri Lanka and India, where some placer material suitable for gem use is found.

United States 
Some fine gems and specimen material have been produced in the United States, with the first discoveries in 1822, in the state of Maine. California became a large producer of tourmaline in the early 1900s. The Maine deposits tend to produce crystals in raspberry pink-red as well as minty greens. The California deposits are known for bright pinks, as well as bicolors. During the early 1900s, Maine and California were the world's largest producers of gem tourmalines. The Empress Dowager Cixi of China loved pink tourmaline and bought large quantities for gemstones and carvings from the then new Himalaya Mine, located in San Diego County, California. It is not clear when the first tourmaline was found in California. Native Americans have used pink and green tourmaline as funeral gifts for centuries. The first documented case was in 1890 when Charles Russel Orcutt found pink tourmaline at what later became the Stewart Mine at Pala, California in San Diego County.

Brazil 

Almost every color of tourmaline can be found in Brazil, especially in the Brazilian states of Minas Gerais and Bahia. The new type of tourmaline, which soon became known as paraiba tourmaline, came in blue and green. Brazilian paraiba tourmaline usually contains abundant inclusions. Much of the paraiba tourmaline from Brazil actually comes from the neighboring state of Rio Grande do Norte. Material from Rio Grande do Norte is often somewhat less intense in color, but many fine gems are found there. It was determined that the element copper was important in the coloration of the stone.

Owned by Billionaire Business Enterprises, it was presented in Montreal, Quebec, Canada, on 14 October 2009.

Africa 

In the late 1990s, copper-containing tourmaline was found in Nigeria. The material was generally paler and less saturated than the Brazilian materials, although the material generally was much less included. A more recent African discovery from Mozambique has also produced tourmaline colored by copper, similar to the Brazilian paraiba. While its colors are somewhat less bright than top Brazilian material, Mozambique paraiba is often less-included and has been found in larger sizes. The Mozambique paraiba material usually is more intensely colored than the Nigerian.

Another highly valuable variety is chrome tourmaline, a rare type of dravite tourmaline from Tanzania. Chrome tourmaline is a rich green color due to the presence of chromium atoms in the crystal. Of the standard elbaite colors, blue indicolite gems are typically the most valuable, followed by green verdelite and pink to red rubellite.

See also 
 Benjamin Wilson – experimented with the electrical properties of tourmaline

References

Citations

General and cited sources

Further reading

External links 

 Tourmaline classification 
 Mindat tourmaline group
 ICA's tourmaline page International Colored Gemstone Association on Tourmaline
 Farlang historical tourmaline references  US localities, antique references
 Webmineral elbaite page, crystallographic and mineral information on elbaite
 Tourmaline Characteristics and Geological data
 Tourmaline History and Lore at GIA.edu

Aluminium minerals
Cyclosilicates
Gemstones
Iron minerals
Lithium minerals
Manganese minerals
Minerals in space group 160
Sodium minerals
Trigonal minerals